CPSP may refer to:

College of Physicians and Surgeons Pakistan 
Colegio de la Preciosa Sangre de Pichilemu
Public Security Police Force of Macau (Corpo de Policia de Segurança Pública de Macau)
Canadian Paediatric Surveillance Program